Pushinka was a dog who was given by the Soviet Premier Nikita Khrushchev to the President of the United States, John F. Kennedy in 1961. Pushinka was the daughter of Strelka, who had travelled into space aboard Korabl-Sputnik 2.

Pushinka arrived at the Kennedy White House after Jacqueline Kennedy had spoken to Khrushchev about Strelka at a state dinner in Vienna. Mrs. Kennedy asked about Strelka's puppies, and one was subsequently sent by Khrushchev to the White House. Pushinka was examined by the Central Intelligence Agency at the Walter Reed Army Medical Center over fears that she may be concealing an implanted listening device. Pushinka was x-rayed, screened with a magnetometer and inspected with a sonogram. She was found to be free of any subversive devices.

The White House electrician and kennel manager, Traphes Bryant, trained Pushinka with peanuts to climb up a ladder to Caroline Kennedy's playhouse and slide down the other side.

Descendants 
Pushinka became pregnant by one of the Kennedy's dogs, Charlie, and gave birth to four puppies that JFK referred to jokingly as pupniks. The White House received 5,000 requests from members of the public asking if they could have one of Pushinka's puppies. Two of the puppies, Butterfly and Streaker, were given away to children in the Midwest. The other two puppies, White Tips and Blackie, stayed at the Kennedy home on Squaw Island but were eventually given away to family friends, with one puppy being given to Patricia Kennedy and her husband Peter Lawford.

Pushinka's descendants were still living as of 2023. Pushinka subsequently became irascible, and "a little nippy"  according to Caroline Kennedy, which she attributed to her upbringing in a scientific laboratory.

See also
 List of individual dogs

References

1961 in American politics
Animals as diplomatic gifts
John F. Kennedy
Soviet emigrants to the United States
Soviet Union–United States relations
Nikita Khrushchev
United States presidential dogs